Religion in Nigeria (being the most populous African country with a population of over 225 million as of 2022) is diverse. The country is home to some of the world's largest Christian and Muslim populations, simultaneously. Nigeria is divided roughly in half between Muslims, who live mostly in the north, and Christians, who live mostly in the south; indigenous religions, such as those native to the Igbo and Yoruba ethnicities, are in the minority. The Christian share of Nigeria's population is on decline due to lower fertility rate compared to Muslims in the north.

Most Nigerian Christians are Protestant (broadly defined), though about a quarter are Catholic. The majority of Nigerian Muslims are either Sunni or non-denominational Muslims. Many Sunni Muslims are members of Sufi brotherhoods or Tariqa. Most Sufis follow the Qadiriyya, Tijaniyyah or Mouride movement. A significant Shia minority also exists (see Shia in Nigeria). There are also Ahmadiyya and Mahdiyya minorities. In terms of Nigeria's major ethnic groups' religious affiliations, the Hausa ethnic group in the north is mostly Muslim the Yoruba tribe in the west is divided among mainly Muslims and Christians with many followers of traditional religions, while the Igbos of the east and the Ijaw in the south are predominantly Christians with some practitioners of traditional religions. The middle belt of Nigeria contains the most of the minority ethnic groups in Nigeria and they are mostly Christians and Christian converts, as well as members of traditional religions with few Muslim converts.

Nigeria is officially a secular state with no official state religion. Article 10 of the Constitution states that “The Government of the Federation or of a State shall not adopt any religion as State Religion.”  However, twelve Muslim-majority northern states have incorporated Sharia courts into their legal systems with the power and jurisdiction of these courts waxing and waning over the past two decades. In some of these states, sharia courts are optional arbitration courts for personal status issues where as in others, sharia has effectively replaced the formerly secular state level legal system in both civil and criminal contexts. This has brought controversy due its discriminatory practices towards religious and sexual minorities. Northern Nigeria has also been the site of ongoing Islamist insurgency which has led to the death and displacement of tens of thousands of people.

Survey data

Figures in the most recent edition of The World Christian Encyclopedia (Johnson and Zurlo 2020) draw on figures assembled and updated as part of the World Christian Database (WCD); these put those who identify as Christians on 46.3%, and Muslims on 46.2 and ‘ethnic religions’ on 7.2%.
WCD figures predict that both Muslism and Christians will continue to grow as a proportion of the population through to 2050. Their projections predict Christians at that point will make up on 48% of the population and Muslims on 48.7%, both growing at the expense of ethnic religions, down to 2.9% of the population. Hsu et al. (2008) found that the WCD appears to overestimate Christian identification and cautioned against what seems to be uncritical acceptance of figures given by religious groups of their membership. The criticisms offered by Hsu et Al (2008) have been supported by evidence found by Nigeria Mckinnon (2020), which demonstrated that the WCD had substantially overestimated the Anglican proportion of the population.

According to a 2018 estimate in The World Factbook by the CIA, the population is estimated to be 53.5% Muslim, 45.9% Christian (10.6% Roman Catholic and 35.3% other Christian), and 0.6% as other. In a 2019 report released by Pew Research Center in 2015, the Muslim population was estimated to be 50% while the Christian population was estimated to be 48.1%. 
The Pew Forum in a 2010 report compared reports from several sources. The 1963 Nigerian census found that 47% of the population was Muslim, 34% Christian, and 18% other. The 2008 MEASURE Demographic and Health Survey (DHS) found 53% Muslim, 45% Christian, and 2% other; the 2008 Afrobarometer poll found 49% Christian, 50% Muslim, and 1% other; Pew's own survey found 52% Muslim, 46% Christian, and 1% other.

Islam

Nigeria has one of the largest Muslim populations in Africa. In Nigeria, about 52 percent of the population is Muslim, The Muslim population in Nigeria continues to grow. Estimates suggest 80-85 million Nigerians identify as Muslim (roughly 50% of the total population), of which the majority are probably Sunni (60 million), though this is not a unified identity and includes a wide variety of different viewpoints. For example, members of Sufi orders, members of the Jama‘atul Izalatul Bid’ah Wa’ikhamatul Sunnah (or Izala) movement, and members of Boko Haram might all identify as Sunni, but the Izala and Boko Haram movements have had strong anti-Sufi components. Estimates also propose that about 4-10 million Nigerians are Shi’a, mostly based in Sokoto, and there is also a significant Lebanese Shi’a diaspora. In Nigeria, the most prominent exsting Sufi orders are the Tijaniyya and Qadiriyya, and a 2012 Pew Research Center survey showed 37% of Nigerians identify with Sufi orders (19% identified specifically as Tijaniyya and 9% as Qadiriyya). Majority of the Muslim population in Nigeria live in the Northern, South western and Central states. Islam was introduced to northern and central Nigeria in the Middle Ages as early as the 11th century and was well established in the major capitals of the region by the 16th century, spreading into the countryside and toward the Middle Belt uplands. Shehu Usman dan Fodio established a government in Northern Nigeria based on Islam before the advent of European colonialism. The British colonial government therefore established indirect rule in Northern Nigeria based on the structure of this government. Islam also came to South Western Yoruba-speaking areas during the time of Mansa Musa's Mali Empire.

The vast majority of Muslims in Nigeria are Sunni belonging to Maliki school of jurisprudence; however, a sizeable minority also belongs to Shafi madhhab. Many Sunni Muslims are members of Sufi brotherhoods. Most Sufis follow the Kadiriyya, Tijaniyya or Mouride movements. Nigerian Islam has become heterogenous with the springing up of many Islamic sects. Notable examples are the Izala movement, the Shia movement, and many local Islamic sects that have limited expansion.

Shia
The Shia Muslims of Nigeria are primarily located in Sokoto State. Shia Muslims make up between two and four million of Nigeria's population. Ibrahim Zakzaky introduced many Nigerians to Shia Islam. The headquarter of Shia is Zaria where the leader lives with his family.

Sufi
Some Nigerian Muslims emphasize asceticism and mysticism and form Sufi groups called tariqas, orders, or brotherhoods. They commonly preach peaceful co-existence and do not sympathize with Islamic extremism. Most Nigerian Sufis follow the Qadiriyya, Tijaniyyah or Mouride movement.

Ahmadiyya
The Ahmadiyya movement established itself in Nigeria in 1916, and make up approximately 3% of the Muslim population. There are numerous Ahmadiyya centres in Nigeria including the Baitur-Raheem Mosque in Ibadan inaugurated in 2008, the Mubarak Mosque in Abuja, which is the last Ahmadiyya mosque, built in the first century of the Ahmadiyya Caliphate. Ahmadiyyas have also established a weekly newspaper called "The Truth" which is the first Muslim newspaper in the country.

Quraniyoon
The Kala Kato are a Nigerian group of Quranists. Their name means "a mere man said it" referring to the narrators of the sayings of Muhammad. The Kalo Kato rely entirely on the Quran and they are found among mostly lower-class communities across northern Nigeria.

Boko Haram and Darul Islam

Islam in Nigeria has witnessed a rise in the numbers of Islamic extremism notably among them, the Boko Haram, Maitatsine, Darul Islam among others.

These sects have sometimes resorted to the use of violence in a bid to realizing their ambitions on the wider Islamic and Nigerian populations as a whole.

The rise of these radical movements has been attributed partly to the poor socio economic infrastructures and poor governance in Nigeria. Poverty has been seen as the major catalyst leading to the rapid increase in the membership of these religious extremist groups. The rise of these sects has also been linked to the increase and aiding of religious extremist by politicians for their selfish ambitions. In recent times, there has been break out of religious crises in the ancient city of Kano with scores of Christians dead and their properties destroyed.

During the 1980s, religious riots occurred in and around the five cities of Kano in 1980, Kaduna in 1982, Bulum-Ketu in 1982, Jimeta in 1984 and Gombe in 1985. These riots were caused by the migration of the rural poor into urban towns during the dry seasons. An offshoot of Islam called the ‘Yan Tatsine’ violently rebelled against the authorities and non-members. These radical Muslims were inspired by Alhaji Mohammed Marwa Maitatsine. He was a Cameroonian preacher who slammed the government, something which led to his arrest in Nigeria in 1975, yet by 1972 many people followed him across society, ranging from the elite to Koranic students called almajiral or gardawa and unemployed migrants. Maitatsine and his followers became separate from orthodox Islam, condemning the corruption of the religious and secular elites and the wealthy upper classes’ consumption of Western goods during the petrol boom in 1974–81. The Boko Haram movement has been connected to the Maitatsine movement. They want to implement Sharia law across the whole of Nigeria.

Christianity

The history of Christianity in Nigeria and how Christianity came to be can be traced back to the 15th century, when the Portuguese were the first Europeans to arrive the shores of the region via the Atlantic. The Portuguese also brought Christianity with them but failed to successfully plant the seed of Christianity because of their involvement in the slave trade. It can be argued that the actual intent behind their voyage was more in the interest of slave business, than it was for missionary goals and objectives. Most of the Portuguese slave traders took Nigerian slaves to be resold in the Americas and parts of Europe. Hence, they were not committed to missionary work. In the 17th century, attempts were again made to establish Christianity in the region through Roman Catholic missionaries.
Nigeria has the largest Christian population in Africa according to Pew Research Center and it has the sixth largest Christian population in the world although the Christians in Nigeria are roughly about 40%-49.3% of the country's population. According to a 2011 Pew report, over 80 million Nigerians are Christians. Among Christians, about a quarter are Catholic, three quarters are Protestant, and about 750,000 belong to other Christian denominations and a few of them are Orthodox Christians. The majority of Nigeria’s approximately 70 million Christians are either Roman Catholic (at least 18.9 million) or Anglican (18 million), but a diverse group of Protestant churches also claim significant members, including Baptists (the Nigerian Baptist Convention claims 6 million worshipping members), Presbyterians, Assemblies of God, Methodists, the Evangelical Reformed Church of Christ, and what are known as the Aladura churches (Pentecostal and Spiritualist independent churches which emerged out of the Anglican Church during colonialism).

The leading Protestant churches in the country are the Church of Nigeria of the Anglican Communion, The African Church, the Assemblies of God Church, the Nigerian Baptist Convention and The Synagogue, Church Of All Nations. The Yoruba area contains a large Anglican population, while Igboland is mainly Anglican and Catholic and the Edo area is predominantly Assemblies of God, which was introduced into Nigeria by Augustus Asonye and his associates at Old Umuahia.

The Nigerian Baptist Convention claims about three million baptized members.

From the 1990s to the 2000s, there was significant growth in Protestant churches, including the Redeemed Christian Church of God, Living Faith Church (Winners' Chapel), Christ Apostolic Church  (CAC) (the first Aladura Movement in Nigeria), Deeper Christian Life Ministry, Evangelical Church Winning All, Mountain of Fire and Miracles, Christ Embassy, Common Wealth of Zion Assembly, Aladura Church (indigenous Christian churches being especially strong in the Yoruba and Igbo areas), and of evangelical churches in general. Also the Watchman Catholic Charismatic Renewal Movement          was formed during this period with branches all over Nigeria. These churches have spilled over into adjacent and southern areas of the middle belt. Denominations like the Seventh-day Adventist also exist.

There are over 300,000 Early Pentecostal Apostolic Churches parishes in Nigeria having about 4.2 million adherents. Such denominations in this group are:

 The Christ Apostolic Church,
 The Apostolic Church,
 The Celestial Church,
 The Cherubim and Seraphim Church et cetera.

There are also about 380,000 New Apostolic Church parishes constituting about 6.5 million believers|New Apostolic Christians in Nigeria include: 
1) The Redeemed Church, 4) Deeper Life Church, 5) Overcomers' Ministries and other new springs. By and large, Protestantism particularly the Pentecostals, Apostolic and evangelicals constitute the major Christian population of Nigeria from the late 1990s to the present.

The Church of Jesus Christ of Latter-Day Saints (LDS) announced creation of new Owerri mission in Nigeria in 2016.

Also, Nigerian pastors are rumored to be great in wealth.

Roman Catholicism

The Archdioceses of the Roman Catholic Church are: Abuja, Onitsha, Jos, Benin City, Calabar, Ibadan, Lagos, and Owerri. It has about 19 million members in Nigeria in 2005. Cardinal Francis Arinze is a Roman Catholic Cardinal from Nigeria. The Pope recently appointed a Nigerian in the person of Professor, Kokunre A. Agbontaen-Eghafona into the Pontifical Academy of Social Sciences (PASS) in the Vatican.

Anglicanism
The ecclesiastical provinces of the Church of Nigeria are:
Lagos, Ibadan, Ondo, Bendel, The Niger, Niger Delta, Owerri, Abuja, Kaduna and Jos. Its primate is Nicholas Okoh.
The Church of Nigeria has about 17 million members.

Christian distribution

The largest ethnic groups in Nigeria are Hausa-Fulani Muslims, the Tarok, Igbo, Kataf which are Christians, And the Yoruba which are almost evenly divided between Islam and Christianity. 
Before the British colonization (1884), there were no inter-religious conflicts, Nigeria in its present borders did not exist as a single nation and the Muslim populations of northern Nigeria lived peacefully in mutual tolerance with the local animist and even Christian minorities. 
The British wanted to procure certain products, such as oil and palm nuts, and to introduce cotton cultivation, and they built railroads through the country with local labor starting in 1893. They administered the country indirectly, strengthening local elites when they were able to represent power.

The bulk of religious violence exists mainly in impoverished urban centers in the northern regions of the country, although coastal centers in the south are also prone to instances of political violence based on religious beliefs, as this is where the non-Hausa Christian minorities reside that are disfavored by the predominantly Hausa Muslim government. Non-Hausa groups residing in southern regions of Nigeria are marginalized by the republic, treated as second-class citizens, and denied their entitlements. The Zango Kataf riot of 1992 is one example of political violence in the south; when the local government announced markets would be moved out of southern Zango, riots erupted and thousands of people were killed as this was yet another instance of governmental discrimination that displaced the predominantly Christian locals.  

The majority of Christians now are found in the south east, South-South, south west and Middle-belt region. It is estimated that around half the Nigerian population today are Muslim, while just under half are Christian. In northern urban centers, however, about 95% of the population is Muslim.

An increasing number of mission stations and mission bookstores, along with churches serving southern enclaves and northern Christians in the northern cities and larger towns, are found in the Muslim north. Christianity in Yoruba area traditionally has been Protestant and Anglican, currently Protestant Pentecostal/evangelicals, whereas Igboland has always been the area of greatest activity by the Roman Catholic Church with current infusions of Protestantism. Other denominations abounded as well.

Presbyterians arrived in the late 17th century in the Ibibio, Annang and Efik land and the Niger Delta area and had missions in the middle belt as well. The works of the Presbyterian Church in Calabar from Scotland by missionaries like Rev Hope M. Waddell, who arrived in Calabar 10 April 1846, in the 19th century and that of Mary Slessor of Calabar are examples. Small missionary movements were allowed to start up, generally in the 1920s, after the middle belt was considered pacified. Each denomination set up rural networks by providing schooling and health facilities. Most such facilities remained in 1990, although in many cases schools had been taken over by the local state government in order to standardize curricula and indigenize the teaching staff.

Pentecostals arrived mostly as indigenous workers in the post-independence period, and in the 1980s, Evangelical and Apostolic Pentecostalism were spreading rapidly throughout the south western and middle belt, having major success in hitherto Roman Catholic and Protestant towns of the south as well . There were also breakaway, or Africanized churches, that blended traditional Christian symbols with indigenous symbols. Among these was the Aladura (prayer) movement that was spreading rapidly throughout Yoruba land and into the non-Muslim middle belt areas.

Missionary work
Apart from Benin and Warri, which had come in contact with Christianity through the Portuguese as early as the 15th century, most missionaries arrived by sea in the 19th century. As with other areas in African continent, Roman Catholics and Anglicans each tended to establish areas of hegemony in southern Nigeria. After World War I, smaller denominations such as the Church of the Brethren (as Ekklesiyar Yan'uwa a Nigeria), Seventh-day Adventists and others worked in interstitial areas, trying not to compete. Although less well-known, African-American churches entered the missionary field in the 19th century and created contacts with Nigeria that lasted well into the colonial period. Also, during this period, Jehovah's Witnesses began their missionary work in Nigeria and soon spread throughout the country

Offshoots of European denominations
African churches were founded by small groups breaking off from the European denominations, especially in Yorubaland, where such independence movements started as early as the early 19th century—influenced by American and British missionaries in early 1900s and stimulated by the great revival of the 1930s. They were for the most part ritually and doctrinally identical to the parent church, although more African music, and later dance and dressage/vesture, entered and mixed with the imported church services. Notable among the new springs of 1930 were such Protestant Pentecostals as the Christ Apostolic Church—an offshoot of US-based Faith Tabernacle which swept through the Western Region and complemented by the likes of the Celestial Church and the Cherubim and Seraphim Church which were indigenous autonomous springs. A number of indigenous denominations used Biblical references to support polygamy.

With political independence came African priests in both Roman Catholic and Protestant denominations. Rituals and forms of worship were strictly those of the home country of the original missionaries. By the 1980s, African music and even dancing were being introduced quietly into western oriented church services, albeit altered to fit into rituals of Euro-American origin. Southern Christians living in the north, especially in larger cities, had congregations and churches founded as early as the 1920s.

Even medium-sized towns (20,000 persons or more) with an established southern enclave had local churches, especially in the middle belt, where both major religions had a strong foothold. The exodus of Igbo from the north in the late 1960s left Roman Catholic churches poorly attended. By the 1980s adherents were back in even greater numbers, and a number of new churches had been built. The middle belt and the west and southwest of Nigeria remain the hold of Protestants (Pentecostal, evangelical and indigenous spring of Christian denominations).

Combination with traditional practices
The Aladura, like several other breakaway churches, stress healing and fulfillment of life goals for oneself and one's family. African beliefs that sorcery and witchcraft are malevolent forces against which protection is required are accepted; rituals are warm and emotional, stressing personal involvement and acceptance of spirit possession. Theology is biblical, but some sects add costumed processions and some accept polygyny. However Christianity cannot be done with traditional practices because Christianity is the belief in the existence of the Holy Trinity(The father, the son and the Holy Spirit) while African Traditional Religion deals with their cosmology, ritual practices, symbols, arts, society, and so these two religions are entirely different from each other with different scope and vision so they cannot both be practiced together because that would be against the rules of either, so a mixture of the both of them neither Christianity nor African Traditional Religion.

Social class and religion
Major congregations of the larger Anglican and Roman Catholic missions represented elite families of their respective areas, although each of these churches had members from all levels and many quite humble church buildings. Nevertheless, a wedding in the Anglican cathedral in Lagos was usually a gathering of the elite of the entire country, and of Lagos and Yorubaland in particular. Such families had connections to their churches going back to the 19th century and were generally not attracted to the breakaway churches. All major urban centers, all universities, and the new capital of Abuja had areas set aside for the major religions to build churches and mosques and for burial grounds.

Traditional beliefs
Alongside the main religious sect is the traditional belief system that without contradicting civil law manages to also govern ethics and morality amongst much of the population.

Traditional religion among the Yoruba People

Within the city and states of Yorubaland as well as its neighbors, a more reserved way of life expresses a theology that links local beliefs to a centrally placed government and its sovereignty over the neighbourhood or communities through the monarch, the king. The seat of the king (oba) is chiefly responsible for the welfare of its subjects, as a confirmation of the legitimacy of the oba's (king) rule over his subjects.

Practices

In addition to ensuring access to, and the continual fertility of, both land and people, seasonal carnivals act as a spectacle for "tourism" contributing to regional productivity. Meanwhile, the practices are not the same; they have some similarities and differences. The acts in a given traditional carnival is dependent on the type of gods or goddesses to be worshiped. While traditional carnivals usually attracts tourists, fun seekers, and community people, it is also good to note that there are certain forbidden acts which prevent people from doing certain things, probably before and during the carnivals.

"Society in general has more gradually and selectively expanded to accommodate new influences, it is fairly certain that they will continue to assert their distinctive cultural identity in creative and often ingenious ways".

Other religions

Baháʼí Faith

After an isolated presence in the late 1920s, the Baháʼí Faith in Nigeria begins with pioneering Baháʼís coming to Sub-Saharan West Africa in the 1950s especially following the efforts of Enoch Olinga who directly and indirectly affected the growth of the religion in Nigeria. Following growth across West Africa a regional National Spiritual Assembly was elected in 1956. As the community multiplied across cities and became diverse in its engagements it elected its own National Spiritual Assembly by 1979 and Operation World estimated 1000 Baháʼís in 2001 though the Association of Religion Data Archives (relying mostly on the World Christian Encyclopedia) estimated some 34,000 Baháʼís in 2005.

Hinduism

Hinduism spread to Nigeria mainly by immigration of Hindus from India and of Hare Krishna Missionaries. Many Nigerians have converted to Hinduism mainly due to efforts of ISKCON Missionaries.
ISKCON has inaugurated the Vedic Welfare Complex in Apapa.

Altogether including Nigerians of Indian origin and NRIs there are 250,000 Hindus in Nigeria. Most of them live in Lagos, the former capital of Nigeria.

Chrislam

Chrislam is a blend of Christianity and Islam that takes practices from both the Bible and the Quran. It hopes to quell religious feuds among Nigerians.

The Grail Movement

Nigeria has become an African hub for the Grail Movement, inspired by the work of Abd-ru-shin, principally In the Light of Truth: The Grail Message.

The Grail Movement is not an organisation in the usual legal sense, but a collective term for all kinds of endeavours to spread the knowledge of the Grail Message and to utilise it in all walks of life.

The associating of adherents of the Grail Message creates the foundation and the outer setting for the holding of hours for the joint worship of God (Hours of Worship) and Grail Festivals.

Facilitating such hours for adherents and readers of the Grail Message is - besides the dissemination of the Grail Message - one of the main concerns of the international Grail Movement. The ideative field of activity with its Hours of Worship and Grail Festivals, lecture events, readings, discussion evenings, seminars, events for children and young people, art exhibitions, concerts and more besides, comprises the actual activity of the Movement.

The Reformed Ogboni Fraternity
A fraternity incorporating references and insignia from the original Ogboni, is based on ancient rites, usages and customs. Established in 1914 by the Ven. Archdeacon T. A. J. Ogunbiyi. Membership is open to all adults who embrace a non-idolatrous faith in God. The fraternity is headquartered in Lagos, Nigeria. In 1996 it had about 710 conclaves/Lodges or Iledi in Nigeria and overseas.

Judaism

Atheism

Inter-religious conflict

While  religious  conflict is not new in Nigeria's  borders, in the 1980s, serious outbreaks of violence between Christians and Muslims, and between the latter and the government occurred, mainly in the North. Subsequent decades have seen the problem worsen, and insurgencies and new conflicts arise.

Several administrations at the federal level have made efforts to counter this, which are still ongoing.

Nigeria is number seven on Open Doors’ 2022 World Watch List, an annual ranking of the 50 countries where Christians face the most extreme persecution.

Christians complain of widespread persecution, especially in the north and Middle Belt. In a speech in the European Parliament, in October 2022, bishop Wilfred Chikpa Anagbe, of the Roman Catholic Diocese of Makurdi, compared the situation of Christians in his country to "nothing short of a Jihad clothed in many names: terrorism, kidnappings, killer herdsmen, banditry, other militia groups" and called on the international community to abandon what he termed a "conspiracy of silence" on the subject.

Catholic Archbishop Matthew Man-Oso Ndagoso sums up the situation facing Christians in the following way. "For the past 14 years the nation has been grappling with Boko Haram, mostly in the northeast. While we were grappling with that, we had the issue of banditry in the northwest. And while we were grappling with this, we had the issue of kidnappings for ransom, which is becoming more widespread. And while grappling with this we have the old conflict with the Fulani herders."

By state 
Religion in Abia State
Religion in Adamawa State
Religion in Akwa Ibom State
Religion in Anambra State
Religion in Bauchi State
Religion in Bayelsa State
Religion in Benue State
Religion in Borno State
Religion in Cross River State
Religion in Delta State
Religion in Ebonyi State
Religion in Edo State
Religion in Ekiti State
Religion in Enugu State
Religion in Gombe State
Religion in Imo State
Religion in Jigawa State
Religion in Kaduna State
Religion in Kano State
Religion in Katsina State
 Religion in Kebbi State
Religion in Kogi State
Religion in Kwara State
Religion in Lagos State
Religion in Nassarawa State
Religion in Niger State
Religion in Ogun State
Religion in Ondo State
Religion in Oyo State
Religion in Plateau State
Religion in Rivers State
Religion in Sokoto State
Religion in Taraba State
Religion in Yobe State
Religion in Zamfara State
Religion in Federal Capital Territory (FCT) State

See also

 The Church of Jesus Christ of Latter-day Saints in Nigeria
 Igbo Jews
 Irreligion in Nigeria

References

 
Religion in the British Empire